Haldimand—Norfolk—Brant was a federal electoral district in Ontario, Canada, that was represented in the House of Commons of Canada from 1997 to 2004. This riding was created in 1996 from parts of Elgin—Norfolk and Haldimand—Norfolk ridings.

It consisted of the Regional Municipality of Haldimand-Norfolk (excluding the Town of Dunnville), the townships of Burford, Oakland and Onondaga in the County of Brant, the Six Nations Indian reserve No. 40 and the New Credit Indian Reserve No. 40A.

The electoral district was abolished in 2003 when it was redistributed between Brant, Haldimand—Norfolk and Oxford ridings.

Members of Parliament
The riding has elected the following Members of Parliament:

Election results

|-
 
| style="width: 130px" |Liberal
|Bob Speller
|align="right"|21,043
|align="right"|45.5
|align="right"|-8.1
|-

 
|Progressive Conservative
|Sharon Hazen
|align="right"|9,704
|align="right"|21.0
|align="right"|+4.8

|New Democratic
|Herman Plas 
|align="right"|2,516
|align="right"|5.4
|align="right"|+1.7

|- bgcolor="white"
!align="left" colspan=3|Total
!align="right"|46,248
!align="right"|
!align="right"|

See also 

 List of Canadian federal electoral districts
 Past Canadian electoral districts

External links 
Federal riding history from the Library of Parliament

Former federal electoral districts of Ontario
1996 establishments in Ontario
2004 disestablishments in Ontario